The Palm Sunday Coup was an attempted military coup d'état in El Salvador which occurred in early-April 1944. The coup was staged by pro-Axis sympathizers in the Salvadoran Army against President General Maximiliano Hernández Martínez.

Background 

General Maximiliano Hernández Martínez became president of El Salvador following a military coup d'état on 4 December 1931 against President Arturo Araujo and the dissolution of the Civic Directory. During the lead up to World War II, Hernández Martínez heavily sympathized with Germany and Italy. Despite his sympathies for the Axis, El Salvador joined the Allies on 8 December 1941 following the Attack on Pearl Harbor by Japan.

Coup 

Hernández Martínez held an election in January 1944 and was reelected to a third term as President. His action angered many businessmen, politicians, and military officer since he blatantly violated the Constitution.

On 2 April 1944, military officers who had pro-Axis sympathies from the 1st Infantry Regiment and the 2nd Artillery Regiment initiated a coup against Hernández Martínez. The coup started on Palm Sunday and most senior military and government officials were either at home or attending church. The rebels rose up in the departments of San Salvador and Santa Ana. They took control of the national radio station and the police headquarters of Santa Ana during the coup. The Salvadoran Air Force joined the conspirators and bombed the city of Santa Ana while the army attacked civilians and overthrew the local government.

By the end of the day, Hernández Martínez ordered military units still loyal to him to crush the revolt. The coup was suppressed on 3 April, martial law was declared, and a national curfew was put in place.

Aftermath 

Following the coup attempt, Hernández Martínez initiated reprisals that lasted for two weeks. Civilian protestors eventually forced Hernández Martínez to resign on 9 May in the Strike of Fallen Arms.

See also 

 Strike of Fallen Arms

References

Citations

Bibliography 

 
 
 
 
 

1944 in El Salvador
Military coups in El Salvador
1940s coups d'état and coup attempts
History of El Salvador
North America in World War II
April 1944 events
Conflicts in 1944